The .45 ACP (not to be confused with .45 Colt) cartridge is a very popular caliber due to its low velocity and relatively high stopping power. This caliber is associated most with the Colt M1911, logically, as ACP literally means 'Automatic Colt Pistol'. However, there are many more guns and variations on the M1911 that are chambered in .45 ACP. This list does not list all of them, just ones that have links to pages on Wikipedia, for further inquiry.

References

 World Guns
Guns Recognition Guide Terry Gander, May 2005, 
Illustrated Directory of 20th Century Guns David Miller, June 2003, 
Jane's Gun Recognition Guide Richard D. Jones, June 2008, 

 
.45 caliber handguns